Sio Gene Therapies, formerly known as Axovant Gene Therapies, is a clinical-stage pharmaceutical company that develops gene therapies to treat neurological disorders. The company is headquartered in New York City and is incorporated in Basel, Switzerland. The company was founded by former hedge fund analyst Vivek Ramaswamy in 2014 as a wholly owned subsidiary of Roivant Sciences. 

It held its IPO in 2015 and raised $315 million.  

As of 2015 the company's most advanced drug candidate was intepirdine, a potential add-on treatment to donepezil for patients with Alzheimer's disease and patients with dementia with Lewy bodies.  Axovant acquired this molecule from GlaxoSmithKline in December 2014. In July 2017, Axovant announced that the results of a phase III trial indicated that the drug was not effective for treatment of Alzheimer's disease.  It also entered clinical trials for dementia with Lewy bodies, which were unsuccessful as well. Consequently, Axovant announced in 2018 that it has discontinued development of this drug. 

As of 2016 Axovant was also developing a second compound, nelotanserin. Axovant acquired global rights to nelotanserin from its former parent, Roivant, which had previously bought those rights from Arena Pharmaceuticals. As of 2016 Axovant was developing it as a treatment for Lewy body dementia

In 2016 Axovant partnered with NFL broadcaster Solomon Wilcots to raise awareness of Alzheimer's clinical trials  That year it also sponsored performances in several U.S cities of “Forget Me Not,” a play by Garrett Davis about an African American family coping with Alzheimer’s disease, in order to raise awareness of its clinical trials in that community, because African Americans are twice as likely to develop Alzheimer’s disease as white Americans, but have been historically underrepresented in clinical research studies.

Also in 2016, Axovant partnered with the mobile rideshare service Lyft to transport patients in Alzheimer's disease studies to clinical facilities. 

In 2017, David Hung joined the company as CEO.

In 2018, David Hung resigned and Pavan Cheruvu became the new CEO.

In December 2018, Axovant added two gene therapy programs to treat GM1 gangliosidosis and Tay–Sachs and Sandhoff diseases.

In June 2019, Axovant announced a strategic partnership with Yposkesi, a leading Contract Development and Manufacturing Organization, to expand Axovant's gene therapy manufacturing capacity.

In August 2019, Axovant was preparing to report data from all three clinical-stage programs in the fourth quarter of 2019, including results from the second cohort of the AXO-LENTI-PD study and data from additional children dosed with AXO-AAV-GM1 and AXO-AAV-GM2.

In November 2020, Axovant rebranded as Sio Gene Therapies.

References

2014 establishments in Bermuda
Companies listed on the Nasdaq
Pharmaceutical companies established in 2014